Kangnasaurus (meaning "Farm Kangnas lizard") is a genus of iguanodontian ornithopod dinosaur found in supposedly Early Cretaceous rocks of South Africa. It is known from a tooth and possibly some postcranial remains found in the early-Aptian Kalahari Deposits Formation. It was probably similar to Dryosaurus.

Discovery and naming

Kangnasaurus was named in 1915 by Sidney H. Haughton. The type species is Kangnasaurus coetzeei. The generic name refers to the Kangnas farm; the specific name to the farmer, Coetzee. Kangnasaurus is based on holotype SAM 2732, a tooth found at a depth of 34 metres in a well at Farm Kangnas, in the Orange River valley of northern Cape Province, South Africa. The age of these rocks, conglomerates in an ancient crater lake, is unclear; they are thought to be from the Early Cretaceous (probably early-Aptian). Haughton thought SAM 2732 was a tooth from the upper jaw, but Michael Cooper reidentified it as a lower jaw tooth in 1985. This had implications for its classification: Haughton thought the tooth was that of an iguanodontid, while Cooper identified it as from an animal more like Dryosaurus, a more basal ornithopod.

Haughton described several other fossils as possibly belonging to Kangnasaurus.  These include five partial thigh bones, a partial thigh bone and shin bone, a partial metatarsal, a partial shin and foot, vertebrae, and unidentified bones.  Some of the bones apparently came from other deposits, and Haughton was not certain that they all belonged to his new genus. Cooper was also not certain, but described the other specimens as if they did belong to Kangnasaurus.

Classification
Kangnasaurus is usually regarded as dubious, although a 2007 review of dryosaurids by Ruiz-Omeñaca and colleagues retained it as potentially valid, differing from other dryosaurids by details of the thigh bone. Like other basal iguanodontians, it would have been a bipedal herbivore.

At least two recent studies have found it to be an elasmarian instead of a dryosaurid.

References

Iguanodonts
Aptian life
Early Cretaceous dinosaurs of Africa
Cretaceous South Africa
Fossils of South Africa
Fossil taxa described in 1915
Taxa named by Sidney H. Haughton
Ornithischian genera